Simon Wardley is a British researcher and former CEO best known for the creation of Wardley mapping.

References

External links 
Map camp website
Simon Wardley on Twitter

Living people
Year of birth missing (living people)
British technology chief executives